The Provincial Minister of Khyber Pakhtunkhwa for Finance is the head of the department of Finance in the Government of Khyber Pakhtunkhwa. The Minister is a member of the Chief Minister's Cabinet. The current Minister of Finance, Mr. Taimur Saleem Khan Jhagra  was appointed by Chief Minister of Khyber Pakhtunkhwa Mahmood Khan on 30 August 2018. The duties of the minister revolve around Finance conditions and concerns in the Khyber Pakhtunkhwa. This includes advising the Chief Minister on matters of Finance. It strives to administer the department of Finance to carry out approved programs and make the public aware of the objectives of the department.

References

Government of Khyber Pakhtunkhwa